Robert Paul Nonini (born August 7, 1954 in Wallace, Idaho) is an American politician who was a Republican member of the Idaho Senate serving District 3 from 2012 to 2018. He previously served in the Idaho State Representative from 2004 to 2012 representing District 5 in the A seat.

Education
Nonini graduated from Wallace High School and attended North Idaho College.

2018 Lieutenant Governor's race
Nonini announced October 9, 2017 on social media that he will run for Lt. Governor of Idaho in 2018. He filed with the Secretary of State's office October 10, 2017.

On March 3, 2018, Nonini reportedly nodded when asked at a candidates forum if the punishment for getting an abortion should include the death penalty. However, he has denied ever having nodded in agreement. "Prosecutions have always been focused on the abortionist," he said later, but such a law and "...the threat of prosecution, would dramatically reduce abortion. That is my goal."

Nonni drew 15% of the primary election vote, placing fourth among Republicans seeking the office.

Elections

References

1954 births
Living people
Republican Party members of the Idaho House of Representatives
People from Wallace, Idaho
21st-century American politicians